XRL may refer to:

Guangzhou–Shenzhen–Hong Kong Express Rail Link, a high-speed railway line connecting Beijing and Hong Kong
Hong Kong West Kowloon railway station, Hong Kong, Immigration Department station code XRL
X-ray laser, a device that uses stimulated emission (The acronym can refer to these in either in the general sense, or as a part of the Strategic Defense Initiative , Project Excalibur )